Ghodamara (घोडामारा) is a small village located in Chakchaki VDC ward no 7 of Jhapa District in Nepal.

Populated places in Jhapa District